Kerpini, is a small mountain village in the north of the municipality of Kalavryta in Achaea, Greece. In 2011 its population was 173. It is 5 km west of Kato Zachlorou and 5 km north of Kalavryta town.

Notable people 
Kerpini was the home of the Zaimis family which produced several revolutionary leaders and politicians:

Andreas Zaimis (1791–1840), fighter in the Greek War of Independence
Thrasyvoulos Zaimis (1822–1880), former Prime Minister of Greece
Alexandros Zaimis (1855–1936), former Prime Minister of Greece, High Commissioner of Crete and President of Greece
Theodoros Zaimis, physician

Population

See also

List of settlements in Achaea

External links
Kerpini at the GTP Travel Pages

References

Kalavryta
Populated places in Achaea